Moezziyeh Rural District is a rural district (dehestan) in Chatrud District, Kerman County, Kerman Province, Iran. At the 2006 census, its population was 6,669 in 1,768 families. The rural district has 21 villages.

References 

Rural Districts of Kerman Province
Kerman County